

H05A Parathyroid hormones and analogues

H05AA Parathyroid hormones and analogues
H05AA01 Parathyroid gland extract
H05AA02 Teriparatide
H05AA03 Parathyroid hormone
H05AA04 Abaloparatide

H05B Anti-parathyroid agents

H05BA Calcitonin preparations
H05BA01 Calcitonin (salmon synthetic)
H05BA02 Calcitonin (pork natural)
H05BA03 Calcitonin (human synthetic)
H05BA04 Elcatonin

H05BX Other anti-parathyroid agents
H05BX01 Cinacalcet
H05BX02 Paricalcitol
H05BX03 Doxercalciferol
H05BX04 Etelcalcetide
H05BX05 Calcifediol

References

H05